Gasconade Township is an inactive township in Wright County, in the U.S. state of Missouri.

Gasconade Township was erected in 1855, taking its name from the Gasconade River.

References

Townships in Missouri
Townships in Wright County, Missouri